Sewn Together is American rock band the Meat Puppets' twelfth full-length studio album, released on May 12, 2009, both on CD and vinyl. It was the follow-up to their 2007 reunion album Rise to Your Knees.

Recording and background

Background 
Curt Kirkwood commented in an interview that the album was put together over a short period of time, comparing its production to the group's earlier albums. He said, "In the '80s, we used to just crap this stuff out. Those SST records cost, like, five grand apiece, if that much, and those are the records that made people like us. Now, if I can get away with it, I'll make a record as cheap as I can and put as little work as I can into it, which is what we did with this one. I don't like putting a lot of time into it. We cut a track, and if we've played it halfway right, we're done with it".

Recording and production 
Sewn Together was recorded at drummer Ted Marcus' apartment and at The Saltmine Studios in Mesa, Arizona, United States.

Content

Musical style 
Courtney Devores of Charlotte Observer delineated the sound of Sewn Together as "warm, psychedelic folk-rock".

Reception

On review aggregation site Metacritic, Sewn Together has a 71 (out of 100) favorable rating based on 14 critics, indicating "generally favorable reviews".

The Boston Globe said:

Track listing
 "Sewn Together" - 3:07
 "Blanket of Weeds" - 5:14
 "I'm Not You" - 4:27
 "Sapphire" - 4:00
 "Rotten Shame" - 5:19
 "Go to Your Head" - 3:44
 "Clone" - 4:37
 "Smoke" - 3:16
 "S.K.A." - 3:47
 "Nursery Rhyme" - 4:28
 "The Monkey and the Snake" - 3:09
 "Love Mountain" - 3:44

Personnel
Curt Kirkwood - vocals, guitars, mandolin
Cris Kirkwood - bass guitar, synthesizers, vocals
Ted Marcus - drums; organ on "Love Mountain"

References

2009 albums
Meat Puppets albums
Megaforce Records albums